The Sciences was a magazine published from 1961 to 2001 by the New York Academy of Sciences. Each issue contained articles that discussed science issues with cultural relevance, illustrated with fine art and an occasional cartoon. The periodical won seven National Magazine Awards over the course of its publication.

External links
 The Sciences Archive
 National Magazine Awards Searchable Database

2001 establishments in New York City
Bimonthly magazines published in the United States
Quarterly magazines published in the United States
Defunct magazines published in the United States
Magazines established in 1961
Magazines disestablished in 2001
Science and technology magazines published in the United States
Magazines published in New York City